Xiu Deshun (born 1 February 1989, in Qingdao) is a Chinese chess grandmaster.

He was a member of the gold medal-winning Chinese team at the Asian Nations Cup 2014 in Tabriz, Iran, where he also won the individual gold medal on the reserve board (board 5). Xiu played for the Chinese team also in the World Youth U16 Chess Olympiad of 2004, winning the team gold medal.

He won the Thailand Open Chess Championship (also known as Bangkok Chess Club Open) in 2008 and 2009, and the IGB Dato' Arthur Tan Malaysia Open in 2013.

Xiu plays for Qingdao Yucai chess club in the China Chess League (CCL).

References

External links
Xiu Deshun chess games at 365Chess.com

1989 births
Living people
Chess grandmasters
Chess players from Shandong
Sportspeople from Qingdao